Sphingomonas polyaromaticivorans  is a Gram-negative, aerobic, short-rod-shaped and non-motile bacteria from the genus of Sphingomonas which has been isolated from water from the Botan Oil Port in Xiamen in China. Sphingomonas polyaromaticivorans has the ability to degrade hydrocarbon compounds.

References

External links
Type strain of Sphingomonas polyaromaticivorans at BacDive -  the Bacterial Diversity Metadatabase

polyaromaticivorans
Bacteria described in 2012